Our Lady or Ladies of Perpetual Succor (also succour) may refer to:

Art:
The icon Our Lady of Perpetual Succor, depicting  the Virgin Mary

Churches
Cathedral of Our Lady of Perpetual Succour, Prizren
Church of Our Lady of Perpetual Succour in Singapore
Our Lady of Succour Church, Socorro, Goa, India
Church of Our Lady of Perpetual Succour in Christchurch, New Zealand
 Our Lady of Perpetual Succour Church, Great Billing, Northamptonshire, England.

Schools
Our Lady of Perpetual Succour Catholic Primary School in West Pymble, Sydney, Australia
Our Lady of Perpetual Succour School in Cairo, Egypt
Our Lady of Perpetual Succour High School in Chembur, Mumbai, India
Our Lady of Perpetual Succor College in Concepcion, Marikina, Philippines
Academia del Perpetuo Socorro in San Juan, Puerto Rico, USA

Theatre
Our Ladies of Perpetual Succour, 2015 play based on The Sopranos